The New Jersey General Assembly is the lower house of the New Jersey Legislature. The following is the roster and leadership positions for the 2010–2012 term. The term began on January 12, 2010, and ended on January 12, 2012.

This assembly was preceded by the 2008–2010 assembly and will be followed by the 2012–2014 assembly.

Leadership
Members of the Assembly's leadership are:

Democratic leadership

Republican leadership

Members of the General Assembly (by district) 

District 1: Nelson Albano (D, Vineland) and Matthew W. Milam (D, Vineland)
District 2: John F. Amodeo (R, Margate) and Vincent J. Polistina (R, Egg Harbor Township)
District 3: John J. Burzichelli (D, Paulsboro) and Celeste Riley (D, Bridgeton)
District 4: Domenick DiCicco (R), Franklin Township) and Paul D. Moriarty (D, Washington Township, Gloucester County)
District 5: Gilbert Wilson (D, Camden) and Angel Fuentes (D, Camden)
District 6: Louis Greenwald (D, Voorhees) and Pamela Rosen Lampitt (D, Cherry Hill Township)
District 7: Herb Conaway (D, Delanco) and Troy Singleton (D, Medford)
District 8: Gerry Nardello (R, Medford) and Scott Rudder (R, Medford)
District 9: Brian E. Rumpf (R, Little Egg Harbor) and DiAnne Gove (R, Long Beach Township)
District 10: James W. Holzapfel (R, Toms River) and David W. Wolfe (R, Brick)
District 11: Mary Pat Angelini (R, Ocean Township) and Dave Rible (R, Wall Township)
District 12: Caroline Casagrande (R, Colts Neck Township) and Declan O'Scanlon (R, Little Silver)
District 13: Amy Handlin (R, Middletown) and Samuel D. Thompson (R, Old Bridge Township)
District 14: Wayne DeAngelo (D, Hamilton) and Daniel R. Benson (D, Hamilton)
District 15: Reed Gusciora (D, Princeton) and Bonnie Watson Coleman (D, Ewing)
District 16: Jack M. Ciattarelli (R, Hillsborough) and Denise Coyle (R Bernards)
District 17: Upendra J. Chivukula (D, Somerset) and Joseph V. Egan (D, New Brunswick)
District 18: Peter J. Barnes III (D, Edison) and Patrick J. Diegnan (D, South Plainfield)
District 19: Craig Coughlin (D, Fords) and John S. Wisniewski (D, Sayreville)
District 20: Joseph Cryan (D, Union) and Annette Quijano (D, Elizabeth)
District 21: Jon Bramnick (R, Westfield) and Nancy Munoz (R, Summit)
District 22: Jerry Green (D, Plainfield) and Linda Stender (D, Fanwood)
District 23: John DiMaio (R, Hackettstown) and Erik Peterson (R, Franklin Township)
District 24: Gary R. Chiusano (R, Franklin, New Jersey) and Alison Littell McHose (R, Sparta Township)
District 25: Michael Patrick Carroll (R, Morris Township) and Tony Bucco (R, Boonton)
District 26: Alex DeCroce (R, Morris Plains) and Jay Webber (R, Morris Plains)
District 27: Mila Jasey (D, South Orange) and John F. McKeon (D, West Orange)
District 28: Ralph R. Caputo (D, Belleville) and Cleopatra Tucker (D, Newark)
District 29: Alberto Coutinho (D, Newark) and L. Grace Spencer (D, Newark)
District 30: Ronald S. Dancer (R, New Egypt) and Joseph R. Malone (R, Bordentown)
District 31: Anthony Chiappone (D, Bayonne) and Charles Mainor (D, Jersey City)
District 32: Vincent Prieto (D, Secaucus) and Joan M. Quigley (D, Jersey City)
District 33: Ruben J. Ramos (D, Hoboken) and VACANT
District 34: Thomas P. Giblin (D, Montclair) and Sheila Y. Oliver (D, East Orange)
District 35: Elease Evans (D, Paterson) and Nellie Pou (D, North Haledon)
District 36: Gary Schaer (D, Passaic) and Kevin J. Ryan (D, Nutley)
District 37: Valerie Huttle (D, Englewood) and Gordon M. Johnson (D, Englewood)
District 38: Joan Voss (D, Fort Lee) and Connie Wagner (D, Paramus)
District 39: Bob Schroeder (R, Washington Township) and Charlotte Vandervalk (R, Hillsdale)
District 40: Scott Rumana (R, Wayne) and David C. Russo (R, Ridgewood)

See also
 List of New Jersey state legislatures

References

2010-2012
2010s in New Jersey